The 2006 California Superintendent of Public Instruction election occurred on June 6, 2006. Incumbent Jack O'Connell defeated Daniel L. Bunting, Sarah L. Knopp, Diane A. Lenning, and Grant McMicken to win a second term, winning at least a plurality in every county.

Results

Results by county

See also
2006 California elections
California Department of Education

References

External links
VoteCircle.com Non-partisan resources & vote sharing network for Californians
Information on the elections from California's Secretary of State

2006 California elections
California Superintendent of Public Instruction elections
California